Aygeshat (also, Aigeshat, known as Hajighara until 1935), is a village in the Armavir Province of Armenia. It is home to the ruined 6th- to 7th-century Targmanchats Vank or Church of Surb Targmanchats (Holy Translators' Church) as well as the 18th-century Church of Surb Gevorg (Saint George), partially restored in the early 20th century. There is also an early tower of Adar Davit on a hill nearby from the 2nd or 1st centuries BC. There is also a monument dedicated to the victims of World War II, 2nd- to 1st-century tombs, 10th- to 18th-century graves, and an early 19th-century wall. The village has a school (235 students), first aid station, house of culture, and a community center.

Gallery

See also 
Armavir Province

References 

 
 World Gazeteer: Armenia – World-Gazetteer.com

External links 

Populated places in Armavir Province